Campbell House is an 1822 heritage house and museum in downtown Toronto, Ontario, Canada. It was built for Upper Canada Chief Justice Sir William Campbell and his wife Hannah. The home was designed for entertaining and comfort, and constructed at a time when the Campbells were socially and economically established and their children had grown to adulthood. The house is one of the few remaining examples of Georgian architecture left in Toronto and is constructed in a style in vogue during the late Georgian era known as Palladian architecture.

History 

More specifically, it stood at the head of Frederick Street as a view terminus, on the site presently occupied by George Brown College's Chef School or Centre for Hospitality at 300 Adelaide Street East. Upon Sir William Campbell's death in 1834, his estate conveyed the house to his wife, Lady Campbell, for her use. After Lady Campbell's death in 1844, her estate auctioned the property and the contents of the house with the proceeds distributed amongst their heirs. For most of the 19th century the structure remained a private residence. It was home to various prominent citizens (Hon. James Gordon, Terence O’Neil, John Strathy and John Fensom) until 1890, by which point the neighbourhood had changed into a commercial and industrial zone. The building eventually came to be used by several businesses after the turn of the 20th century as office space and a factory, including Hobbs Glass Company; Capewell Horse Nail Company and Masco Elevator Company.

In 1972, the last owners of the property, the Coutts-Hallmark Greeting Cards Company, wanted to demolish the house to expand its parking lot. Prior to demolition the company offered the house to anyone who could remove it from the property. A professional association of trial lawyers known as the Advocates Society, launched a campaign to save the building. They eventually secured the site at the northwest corner of University Avenue and Queen Street West, south of the Canada Life Building (formerly site of three buildings at the corner including United Clothing Store). The move was a major spectacle, and attracted a large crowd as it closed several downtown streets. Her Majesty Queen Elizabeth, the Queen Mother opened the fully restored structure on June 28, 1974.

The preservation of the house was an important turning point in architectural preservation in Toronto. During the 1950s and 1960s, 19th-century homes were demolished at a rapid rate; in his 1967 book Toronto, No Mean City, architect Eric Arthur predicts that by the year 2000, there may be no 19th-century buildings left in the city. The spectacle of the physical move to save Campbell House was a preservation achievement which sparked greater interest among Torontonians to save other local landmarks when they became threatened. This inspired permanent outdoor exhibit, Lost and Found, which was installed in the Campbell House gardens in 2018.

The home is owned by the City of Toronto government and operated by the Sir William Campbell Foundation. It is a historic house museum and a former club for the members of the Advocates Society. The home has also displayed numerous exhibitions, including the 2013 show by Canadian contemporary artist Harley Valentine, titled Barbarians at the Gate.

See also
List of oldest buildings and structures in Toronto
List of museums in Toronto

References

External links

 Campbell House Museum Website

Houses in Toronto
Museums in Toronto
Historic house museums in Ontario
Art museums and galleries in Ontario
Georgian architecture in Canada
Houses completed in 1822
Relocated houses
1822 establishments in Upper Canada